Nowroji Road is an important road in the Indian city of Visakhapatnam. this road linked to Beach Road to Waltair Main Road. Nowroji Road is very posh area in the city and there are many star hotels are situated hear, royal families Bobbili, Vizianagaram, Jeypore and Kalahandi extent of lands hear.

References

Roads in Visakhapatnam
Shopping districts and streets in India